Creepshow is an American horror anthology streaming television series that was released on Shudder in 2019. The series serves as a continuation of the 1982 film of the same name and features seventeen episodes with two horror stories per episode. The series premiered on September 26, 2019.

On October 30, 2019, the series was renewed for a second season. On October 30, 2020, an animated special titled A Creepshow Animated Special was released. On November 10, 2020, it was announced that a holiday special titled A Creepshow Holiday Special would premiere on December 18, 2020. On February 18, 2021, the series was renewed for a third season, and the second season premiered on April 1, 2021. The third season debuted on September 23, 2021. On February 10, 2022, the series was renewed for a fourth season.

Premise
The Creep shows audience members darkly grim horror stories from the pages of the Creepshow comic book. Each story evokes the traits of a comic book like the first Creepshow film and shows some occasional advertisements of horror products promoted in the comics.

Episodes

Production

Development
In July 2018, the Creepshow television series was announced, with Greg Nicotero listed as a producer and streaming service Shudder as the distributor.

As in the original Creepshow, the Creep is a full-bodied puppet that delivers gags (mostly featured in the cold openings of each episode) through nonverbal cues or laughter. There were some episodes that used an animated version of the Creep.

Adaptations
On January 16, 2019, it was announced that one of the segments of the pilot episode would be based on Stephen King's short story, "Survivor Type" from his 1985 collection Skeleton Crew; however, that story was ultimately not used for the first season and was instead part of the animated Halloween special that aired in 2020.

As with the feature films, the series draws from short story fiction. Subsequently, the following were also announced as the basis for stories:

 Gray Matter by Stephen King
 By the Silver Water of Lake Champlain by Joe Hill
 The Companion by Joe R. Lansdale
 The House of the Head by Josh Malerman
 The Man in the Suitcase by Christopher Buehlman
 All Hallows Eve by Bruce Jones
 Times Is Tough in Musky Holler by John Skipp and Dori Miller
 The Finger by David J. Schow
 Survivor Type by Stephen King
 Twitterings from the Circus of the Dead by Joe Hill
 Shapeshifters Anonymous by J. A. Konrath
 Mums by Joe Hill

Original stories announced include:

 Lydia Layne's Better Half by John Harrison and Greg Nicotero
 Skincrawlers written by Paul Dini and Stephen Langford
 Night of the Paw by John Esposito
 Bad Wolf Down by Rob Schrab
 Model Kid by John Esposito
 Public Television Of The Dead by Rob Schrab
 Dead and Breakfast by Michael Rousselet and Erik Sandoval
 Pesticide by Frank Dietz
 The Right Snuff by Paul Dini, Stephen Langford and Greg Nicotero
 Sibling Rivalry by Melanie Dale
 Pipe Screams by Daniel Kraus
 Within the Walls of Madness by John Esposito and Greg Nicotero
 Night of the Living Late Show by Dana Gould
 Queen Bee by Erik Sandoval and Michael Rousselet
 Skeletons in the Closet by John Esposito
 Familiar by Josh Malerman
 The Last Tsuburaya by Paul Dini and Stephen Langford
 Okay, I'll Bite by John Harrison
 Stranger Sings by Jordana Arkin
 Meter Reader by John Esposito
 Time Out by Barrington Smith and Paul Seetachit
 The Things in Oakwood's Past by Greg Nicotero and Daniel Kraus
 Drug Traffic by Mattie Do & Christopher Larsen
 A Dead Girl Named Sue by Heather Anne Campbell

Casting
In April 2019, cast members announced included Adrienne Barbeau, Giancarlo Esposito, and Tobin Bell. Subsequent announced cast members included David Arquette, Tricia Helfer, and Dana Gould. On June 20, 2019, Jeffrey Combs, Bruce Davison, DJ Qualls, Big Boi, and Kid Cudi were announced as additional cast members.

In September 2020, Anna Camp, Adam Pally, Josh McDermitt, Keith David, and Ashley Laurence were cast for the second season. Later in October 2020, Marilyn Manson, Ali Larter, Iman Benson, Ryan Kwanten, Barbara Crampton, C. Thomas Howell, Denise Crosby, Breckin Meyer, Ted Raimi, Kevin Dillon and Eric Edelstein were cast. On February 1, 2021, It was announced that Manson's episode would not air due to multiple abuse allegations and that an episode starring Molly Ringwald would air instead.

In March 2021 it was announced that Justin Long and D'Arcy Carden would be starring in an episode.

Season 3 cast members include King Bach, Ethan Embry, Michael Rooker, James Remar, Reid Scott and Johnathon Schaech.

Directors
Unlike the film entries, the Creepshow series will feature several directors instead of one director. Announced segment directors include David Bruckner, Roxanne Benjamin, Rob Schrab, John Harrison, Greg Nicotero, and Tom Savini; the latter three having worked on the first two Creepshow features.

Filming
Principal photography for the series began in February 2019 in Atlanta, Georgia. Season 2 began filming in September 2020; it was supposed to begin in March 2020, but was shut down due to the COVID-19 pandemic.

Release
The series premiered on Shudder September 26, 2019.

Critical reception
The series received acclaim from critics. On Rotten Tomatoes, the series holds an approval rating of 97% based on 29 reviews with an average rating of 7.7/10. The critical consensus reads: "Delightfully eerie, Creepshow captures the spirit of the original while forging its own spooky path." On Metacritic, the series has a weighted average score of 64 out of 100, based on 5 critics, indicating "generally favorable reviews".

Tie-in novels
Scholastic Books released a book entitled Creepshow: The Taker, featuring two novellas inspired by the TV series. They were written by Elley Cooper. A followup installment was released on April 28, 2021, entitled Creepshow: The Cursed, also written by Elley Cooper.

Halloween Horror Nights
On August 3, 2019, Universal Parks & Resorts announced that Creepshow would be coming to Halloween Horror Nights exclusively at its Universal Studios Hollywood theme park. The maze featured three segments from the 1982 film ("Father's Day", "The Crate", and "They're Creeping Up on You") as well as two others from the newly made web television version for Shudder ("Gray Matter" and "Bad Wolf Down").

References

External links

Official Creepshow Store

2019 American television series debuts
2010s American anthology television series
2010s American horror television series
2020s American anthology television series
2020s American horror television series
American horror fiction television series
English-language television shows
Horror anthology web series
Horror fiction web series
Shudder (streaming service) original programming
Television shows based on works by Stephen King
Television shows filmed in Atlanta